The CALIFA Survey (Calar Alto Legacy Integral Field Area Survey) is an astronomical project to map 600 galaxies with integral field spectroscopy (IFS), to allow detailed studies of these objects. The data are taken at the Calar Alto Observatory in Spain.

Project
The CALIFA project addresses a number of open questions in galaxy evolution, among them: 
 The chemical evolution of galaxies: how, when, and where metals are produced in galaxies
 Galaxy masses from different tracers: how much mass there is in stars, gas, and dark matter, and how it is distributed
 Galaxy assembly as traced from the kinematic structure: what the motions of stars and gas tell us about the structure of the galaxies
 Galaxy assembly as traced through the stellar population content: how, when, and where did stars form throughout the history of the galaxies

CALIFA data are made public through regular releases (DR). DR1, containing 200 data cubes of 100 galaxies, was released 1 November 2012. DR2, containing 400 data cubes of 200 galaxies, was released on 1 October 2014.

Further reading
 "CALIFA: Calar Alto Legacy Integral Field spectroscopy Area Survey, Early Report"; S. F. Sánchez et al.; Galaxy Formation: An International Conference, July 2011, id.P88,  ; 
 "CALIFA, the Calar Alto Legacy Integral Field Area survey. I. Survey presentation"; S. F. Sánchez et al.; Astronomy & Astrophysics, Volume 538, id.A8, 31 pp. February 2012;  ;  ; 
 "CALIFA, the Calar Alto Legacy Integral Field Area survey. II. First public data release"; B. Husemann et al.; Astronomy & Astrophysics, Volume 549, id.A87, 25 pp. January 2013;  ;  ; 
 http://califa.caha.es/DR1
 "CALIFA, the Calar Alto Legacy Integral Field Area survey. III. Second public data release"; R. García-Benito et al.; September 2014 ;  ;  ; 
 http://califa.caha.es/DR2
 "The CALIFA survey: Status Report"; S. F. Sánchez et al.; December 2014 ;  ;  ;

Notes

References

External links
 CALIFA official website: http://califa.caha.es
 Calor Alto Observatory: http://www.caha.es

Observational astronomy
Astronomical surveys